The 1956 Ivy League football season was the first season of college football play for the Ivy League and was part of the 1956 NCAA University Division football season. The season began on September 29, 1956, and ended on November 24, 1956. Ivy League teams were 4–7–1 against non-conference opponents and Yale won the conference championship.

Season overview

Schedule

Week 1

Week 2

Week 3

Week 4

Week 5

Week 6

Week 7

Week 8

Week 9

1957 NFL Draft

Four Ivy League players were drafted in the 1957 NFL draft, held in November 1956 and January 1957: Al Ward, Paul Lopata, Dennis McGill, and Mike Bowman.

References